Zbiór potrzebniejszych wiadomości (A Collection of Essential Information), a two-volume work by Ignacy Krasicki published 1781–83, was one of the first Polish encyclopedias.

History
Krasicki's Polish encyclopedia followed Jan Protasowicz's Inventores rerum (1608), Stanisław Stokowski's Encyclopaedia Natvralis Entis  (1637), and Benedykt Chmielowski's Nowe Ateny (The New Athens, 1745).

The Polish poet and writer Ignacy Krasicki was inspired to produce his encyclopedia by the work of the French Encyclopédistes, including Denis Diderot, Jean le Rond d'Alembert, and Voltaire, whom he had met while visiting France.

Krasicki later expanded his Collection, which eventually reached six volumes that were published in Warsaw after his death as part of a collected edition of Krasicki's works. The six-volume edition, published in 1828–33 by Adam Jakubowski, was printed by Natan Glücksberg.

References

Bibliography
 
 

1781 non-fiction books
Polish encyclopedias
18th-century encyclopedias
Book series introduced in 1781
Works by Ignacy Krasicki